Diana M. Glomb-Rogan (born February 3, 1947) is an American politician and social worker.

Born in Chicago, Illinois, Glob received her bachelor's degree in elementary education from University of Louisiana at Monroe and her master's degree in social work from Louisiana State University. Glomb was a social worker and lived in Reno, Nevada. From 1993 to 1997, Glomb served in the Nevada State Senate and was a Democrat.  She was the first woman on the senate finance committee.

Notes

External links
A Guide to the 	Diana Glomb Records, 96-11. Special Collections, University Libraries, University of Nevada, Reno.

1947 births
Living people
Politicians from Chicago
Politicians from Reno, Nevada
University of Louisiana at Monroe alumni
Louisiana State University alumni
Women state legislators in Nevada
Democratic Party Nevada state senators
21st-century American women